The Eggs is a children's animated television program that broadcast on the Nine Network on July 16, 2004 to May 15, 2009. There are 52 episodes of 12 minutes duration. Two episodes were usually screened together in a half hour timeslot.
The Eggs was produced by Tony Byrne and Brendan Byrne (not related).

Series synopsis
The Eggs follows the colourful adventures of the four anthropomorphic egg college graduates as they continue their mission through the Looneyverse to search out valuable new sounds for their music-loving home planet of Kazoo. On their travels, they visit many unique and strange different planets each with their own music and sounds.

Characters

Main
Benedict (voiced by Mike O'Reilly (speaking); John Koensgen (singing))
Yolky (voiced by Kate Hurman (speaking); Andrea Lees (singing))
Scramble (voiced by Terrence Scammell)
Sunnyside (voiced by Hélène Joy)

Recurring
Shelly (voiced by Hélène Joy)
Min (voiced by Kate Hurman)
Eggor (voiced by Rick Jones)
The Worms
Eeny (voiced by Terrence Scammell)
Meeny (voiced by Rick Jones)
Miney (voiced by Mike O'Reilly)
Fred (voiced by Terrence Scammell)

Voice Cast

Main
Mike O'Reilly - Benedict (speaking), Miney
John Koensgen - Benedict (singing)
Kate Hurman - Yolky (speaking), Min
Andrea Lees - Yolky (singing)
Terrence Scammell - Scramble, Eeny, Fred
Hélène Joy - Sunnyside, Shelly
Rick Jones - Eggor, Meeny

Additional Voices
Pierre Brault
Kate Hurman
Rick Jones
Hélène Joy
John Koensgen
Nancy Neilson
Mike O'Reilly
Terrence Scammell
Ross Wilson

Episode List
The Beginning (airdate: July 16, 2004)
One at a Time (airdate: July 23, 2004)
The Worms of Ineptune (airdate: July 30, 2004)
Planet Jollywood (airdate: August 6, 2004)
A Lullaby for Shelly (airdate: August 13, 2004)
The Dangerous Driver (airdate: August 20, 2004)
Where's Shelly? (airdate: August 28, 2004)
There's Shelly (airdate: September 3, 2004)
Choog (airdate: September 10, 2004)
A Hairy Adventure (airdate: September 17, 2004)
A Hair Raising Tale (airdate: September 24, 2004)
The Ogre's Nose (airdate: October 1, 2004)
Yolky Saves the Day (airdate: October 8, 2004)
The Bloogles (airdate: October 15, 2004)
Peanut Surprise (airdate: October 22, 2004)
The Stringiest Bean (airdate: October 29, 2004)
Gulpy Wulpy (airdate: November 5, 2004)
Rubbish Shoot (airdate: November 12, 2004)
Sunnyside Up (airdate: November 26, 2004)
Which Came First (airdate: December 3, 2004)
The Black Hole (airdate: December 10, 2004)
Doh Rey Me (airdate: December 17, 2004)
The Missing Egg (airdate: December 24, 2004)
Growth Sprout (airdate: December 31, 2004)
Tune Up (airdate: December 31, 2004)
Counting the Beat (airdate: December 31, 2004)
Double Yolkers (airdate: January 7, 2005)
Cinderbot (airdate: January 14, 2005)
Message in a Bottle (airdate: January 21, 2005)
Music Trap (airdate: January 28, 2005)
The Big Freeze (airdate: February 4, 2005)
Too Much of a Good Thing (airdate: February 11, 2005)
Now You See Her (airdate: February 18, 2005)
Pet Show (airdate: February 25, 2005)
The Bubatuba (airdate: March 4, 2005)
The Silent Shell (airdate: March 11, 2005)
The Flying Pan (airdate: March 25, 2005)
The March of Ides (airdate: April 1, 2005)
Crosswinds (airdate: April 8, 2005)
Treasure Island (airdate: April 15, 2005)
Water Music (airdate: April 22, 2005)
Top of the Pops (airdate: April 29, 2005)
The Dance Craze (airdate: May 6, 2005)
Lost in Space (airdate: May 13, 2005)
Copy Cat (airdate: May 20, 2005)
Country Music Blues (airdate: May 28, 2005)
Plunka (airdate: June 3, 2005)
A Visit to Oogy (airdate: June 10, 2005)
Don't Go Home (airdate: June 24, 2005)
Return to Monotogmous (airdate: July 1, 2005)
The Deserter (airdate: July 8, 2005)
Homecoming (airdate: October 7, 2005)

References

External links

2000s Australian animated television series
2004 Australian television series debuts
2005 Australian television series endings
2000s Canadian animated television series
2004 Canadian television series debuts
2005 Canadian television series endings
Australian children's animated adventure television series
Canadian children's animated adventure television series
Nine Network original programming